The Bosnian-Herzegovinian Greens (abbr. BHZ) is a green political party in Bosnia and Herzegovina. It was founded on 2 March 2022.

History
The Bosnian-Herzegovinian Greens was founded by Sevlid Hurtić on 2 March 2022.

At the 2022 general election, the party contested all levels of government except for the Presidency, gaining one seat in the National Assembly of Republika Srpska. Following the 2022 general election, a coalition led by the Alliance of Independent Social Democrats, the Croatian Democratic Union and the Social Democratic Party, including the Bosnian-Herzegovinian Greens, reached an agreement on the formation of a new government.

Elections

Parliamentary elections

References

External links
Official Website

Green liberalism
Pro-European political parties in Bosnia and Herzegovina
Political parties established in 2022
2022 establishments in Bosnia and Herzegovina